A Fisher-Porter tube or Fisher-Porter vessel is a glass pressure vessel used in the chemical laboratory. The reaction vessel consists of a lipped heavy-wall borosilicate glass tube and a lid made from stainless steel. The lid is sealed with an o-ring and held in place with a coupling.

The advantage over steel autoclaves is that the progress of a reaction can be followed by eye.  The maximum pressure that can be achieved is much lower than that in a metal bomb. For example, typical pressure ratings are 7 bar for a large 335 mL Fisher-Porter vessel and 15 bar for a small 90 mL one, whereas the usual kind of bomb is safe to use with 200 bar.  Illustrative applications involve reactions at elevated temperatures using volatile reagents.

Name
The name has become something of a genericised trademark. For decades these flasks used to be made by the Fisher & Porter Company until it became a part of ABB. Nowadays they are sold by Andrews Glass under the Lab-Crest label.

Alternatives

Ace Glass offers thick-walled glass tubes with their proprietary Ace-Thred screw caps. Caps are available to fit gas plunger valves to admit gases under pressure. Similar arrangements are available from Q Labtech and sold through Sigma-Aldrich.

External links
 Manufacturer's webpage

References

Laboratory equipment
Pressure vessels
 Q-Tube, a safer alternative pressure vessel